= Maruteh =

- Location within Borneo
- Coordinates: 1.35°N 111.71667°E
- Country: Malaysia
- State: Sarawak
- Elevation: 123 m (404 ft)

Maruteh is a settlement in Sarawak, Malaysia. It lies approximately 156.1 kilometres (97 mi) east of the state capital Kuching. Neighbouring settlements include:

- Tebat 2.6 kilometres (1.6 mi) northwest
- Nanga Mejong 2.6 kilometres (1.6 mi) southwest
- Balae 4.1 kilometres (2.5 mi) northeast
- Nanga Murat 5.9 kilometres (3.7 mi) west
- Nanga Kujoh 5.9 kilometres (3.7 mi) north
- Begong 6.7 kilometres (4.2 mi) southwest
- Sungai Geranggang 7.4 kilometres (4.6 mi) south
- Nanga Mujan 7.6 kilometres (4.7 mi) west
- Bunu 7.9 kilometres (4.9 mi) southwest
- Jambu 9.3 kilometres (5.8 mi) northeast
