= Balae =

- Location within Borneo
- Coordinates: 1.38333°N 111.73333°E
- Country: Malaysia
- State: Sarawak
- Elevation: 98 m (322 ft)

Balae is a settlement in Sarawak, Malaysia. It lies approximately 157.3 kilometres (98 mi) east of the state capital Kuching. Neighbouring settlements include:

- Tebat 4.1 kilometres (2.5 mi) southwest
- Nanga Kujoh 4.1 kilometres (2.5 mi) northwest
- Maruteh 4.1 kilometres (2.5 mi) southwest
- Nanga Pinchok 5.6 kilometres (3.5 mi) north
- Jambu 5.9 kilometres (3.7 mi) east
- Ulu Durai 5.9 kilometres (3.7 mi) north
