= Tebat =

- Location within Borneo
- Coordinates: 1.36667°N 111.7°E
- Country: Malaysia
- State: Sarawak
- Elevation: 95 m (312 ft)

Tebat (also known as Tebut) is a settlement in Sarawak, Malaysia. It lies approximately 153.9 kilometres (96 mi) east of the state capital Kuching. Neighbouring settlements include:

- Maruteh 2.6 kilometres (1.6 mi) southeast
- Nanga Kujoh 3.7 kilometres (2.3 mi) north
- Nanga Mejong 3.7 kilometres (2.3 mi) south
- Balae 4.1 kilometres (2.5 mi) northeast
- Nanga Murat 5.2 kilometres (3.2 mi) southwest
- Nanga Mujan 6.7 kilometres (4.2 mi) southwest
